The WonderLab Museum of Science, Health & Technology is a science museum located in the city of Bloomington, Indiana, United States. It was incorporated in 1995 as a private 501(c)(3) non-profit organization. WonderLab is a member of the Association of Science-Technology Centers.

History 
WonderLab began operation as a traveling outreach program run by a group of volunteers. In 1998, WonderLab opened a small, interim museum on the north side of the Bloomington courthouse square. At the same time, a capital campaign was launched to build a permanent museum on a downtown lot donated by the city of Bloomington. The current  museum opened to the public on March 29, 2003. Today, WonderLab is in the heart of the Bloomington Entertainment and Arts District (BEAD) and is a visitor attraction on the B-Line Trail .

Inside the Museum 
WonderLab is an accessible facility with two floors of hands-on science exhibits. Several exhibits are permamant, while others are rotated off and on throughout the year. Some of the highlights are listed below:

First Floor
A popular exhibit on the first floor is the Grapevine Climber, which allows visitors to climb up giant leaves to view the museum from a different perspective. The Bubble-Airium offers multiple exhibits that showcase unexpected ways of forming and using bubbles. The Lego Water Table allows children to dam and divert water flowing down a large lego sheet. The first floor is also home to the Discovery Garden, an enclosed area with age-appropriate science activities for toddlers and preschoolers.

Second Floor
The second floor is home to many of the live animal exhibits at WonderLab, as well as exhibits about southern Indiana’s geologic past as interpreted through fossils. In addition, the floor features exhibits relating to health, the human body and the science of sound.

Lester P. Bushnell WonderGarden 
WonderLab’s WonderGarden is a small nature area set between the museum building and the B-Line Trail. The garden includes a selection of outdoor science exhibits and an amphitheater for science programs. Museum visitors may check out nature packs at the welcome desk to use for exploring the science of the garden in different seasons.

Other Educational Activities 
WonderLab presents science programs for all ages, conducts a summer science camp, is a partner in the MCCSC after-school enrichment program, provides outreach services, and offers professional development workshops for teachers. In addition, the museum provides work experiences for Indiana University college students, summer internships for high school students, and a variety of volunteer opportunities for hundreds of teens and adults.

Selected awards 
Certified Wildlife Habitat (WonderGarden) — certified by the National Wildlife Federation in 2009 
Best Place to Volunteer — awarded by the Indiana Daily Student in 2009 
Top 25 Hands-On Science Center in the United States — ranked #17 by Parents (September 2008 issue)  
Community Enhancement Award — awarded by the Greater Bloomington Chamber of Commerce in 2003
Attraction of the Year — awarded by the Bloomington/Monroe County Convention and Visitors Bureau in 2003

References

External links 
Museum website
WonderLab Facebook Page

Museums established in 1995
Science museums in Indiana
Children's museums in Indiana
Buildings and structures in Bloomington, Indiana
Museums in Monroe County, Indiana
Association of Science-Technology Centers member institutions
Tourist attractions in Bloomington, Indiana